John Baker Holroyd, 1st Earl of Sheffield (21 December 1735 – 30 May 1821) was an English politician who came from a Yorkshire family, a branch of which had settled in the Kingdom of Ireland.

Biography 
His grandfather was Isaac Holroyd (1643–1706), a merchant who emigrated to Ireland after the Restoration. His father was Isaac Holroyd (1708–78), who lived at Dunamore in County Meath. John, the eldest son, first took the name of Baker on inheriting the estates of his uncle, Rev. James Baker, in 1768 and added Holroyd on the death of his own father in 1778.

Having served in the Army until 1763, he travelled for a while on the continent where he became close friends with the writer and historian Edward Gibbon, later the author of The History of the Decline and Fall of the Roman Empire. On his return he used his inherited wealth to buy in 1769 the country house of Sheffield Hall in Sussex for £31,000 from Lord De La Warr. In 1780 he was elected to represent Coventry in the House of Commons, where he was prominent against the anti-Catholic Lord George Gordon and the Gordon rioters.

In 1781 he was created a Peer of Ireland as Baron Sheffield, of Dunamore in the County of Meath, and in 1783 was further created Baron Sheffield, of Roscommon in the County of Roscommon, with a special remainder in favour of his daughters. As Irish peerages they did not interrupt his Parliamentary career and he was re-elected for Coventry in 1781 and for Bristol in 1790. His Parliamentary career did end however in 1802, when he was created a Peer of the United Kingdom as Baron Sheffield, of Sheffield in the County of York. In 1816, he was also created Viscount Pevensey and Earl of Sheffield in the Peerage of Ireland.

In 1783 he was elected a Fellow of the Royal Society.

He married Abigail Way, daughter of Lewis Way of Richmond, Surrey with whom he had a son and 2 daughters. Abigail died in 1793. In 1795 he married The Hon. Lucy Pelham (22 February 1763 – 18 January 1797), daughter of Sir Thomas Pelham, !st Earl of Chichester. His third marriage was to Lady Anne North (16 February 1760 – 18 January 1832), the daughter of the former Prime Minister Lord North on 20 January 1798.
 
The Earl died in 1821 and was buried in the Sheffield family mausoleum attached to the north transept of the Church of St Mary and St Andrew, Fletching, East Sussex. When Edward Gibbon died in 1794 whilst visiting the Earl, he too had been buried in the same mausoleum as a mark of respect. The Holroyd family are commemorated in the surrounding panels. The Earl's son and grandson succeeded in turn as second and third Earls of Sheffield, the latter being a well-known patron of cricket and on whose death the earldom became extinct.

The 1st Earl of Sheffield's daughter Maria Josepha married John Stanley, 1st Baron Stanley of Alderley on 11 October 1796, and therefore the Irish barony, under the special remainder, later passed to Edward Stanley, 4th Baron Stanley of Alderley, who thus became the fourth Baron Sheffield.

Army Service 
In 1760, upon entering the army, he led a mounted light infantry regiment called the Royal Foresters under the command of John Manners, Marquess of Granby. After the war, he was promoted the rank of captain (The Annual Biography and Obituary, Volume 6, 1822).

It took almost 20 years before his service was called again, into war among several European powers. He started as a major and rose to the ranks of colonel when put up his own cavalry, the 22nd Regiment of Light Dragoons, during the Anglo-France War. (The Annual Biography and Obituary, Volume 6, 1822)

Works and publications 
In 1783, he wrote his opinions on the state of trade and commerce between Great Britain and its former subject America. The pamphlet Observations on the Commerce of the American States (Dublin, 1783), which ran six editions, made a comparative analysis of export and import calendar between two countries. It chronicled the amount of traded staple commodities during the prosperous year of 1773 and its disastrous year a decade later, the fluctuations in exports and imports during peacetime and war, and all the imports and exports to West Indies among many others. The Observations was written in opposition to the bill introduced by William Pitt in 1783, proposing to relax the navigation laws in favour of the United States. Pitt abandoned the proposal after it received considerable opposition. Edward Gibbon later said that in the Observations, "[t]he Navigation act, the Palladium of Britain, was defended, and perhaps saved, by his pen; and he proves, by the weight of fact and argument, that the mother-country may survive and flourish after the loss of America".

In 1790, he published Observations on the Project for Abolishing the Slave Trade, in which he took a conservative position on the debate over abolitionism, condemning the "inconsiderate and impracticable manner in which a great proportion of the community profess a disposition to relieve Negroes from slavery." Fearful of interfering with the right of enslavers to their human "property", he claimed that "nothing is more vain and empty than the idea that the British Legislature could immediately abolish slavery", and commended what he perceived as the "disposition shewn by the West-Indian assemblies to do everything that might be suggested for the advantage of the Negroes."

In Observations on the Manufactures, Trade, and Present State of Ireland (London, 1785), he also talked about the free trade and why Ireland and Great Britain should not proceed with its tariff war on their respective products like wool, woolens, cattle produce, fisheries, and variety of manufactures.

But in terms of agriculture, he maintained a more protectionist stance. He supported discussions on the agriculture to be of paramount importance as it tends to the true greatness and stability of a nation.

He opposed the kingdom's reliance on importation of corn, wheat, and other grains. He then published a series of pamphlet that tackles how the parliament should take care of its food production. On Observations on the Corn Bill (London, 1791), he advocated in higher yet stable price of corn, cultivate inferior land instead of using it for pasture, and emphasized that higher corn price is beneficial for manufactures.

He continued with Remarks on the Deficiency of the Grain; on the means of Present Relief, and of Future Plenty (London, 1800) where he expressed his displease on attacks against farmers on the suspicions that they are keeping the finest flour for themselves. He also asserted in his pamphlet that having rich farmers is of an utmost benefit to the society because they improve agriculture and keep the stocks of grain without too much stress to the public.

At a speech delivered in the House of Commons on 30 July 1801 he criticised the large sum they paid for importation of grain from foreign countries that arose from scarcity of grain and might result to creating a "dangerous policy of feeding the people at the public expense" (The Annual Biography and Obituary, Volume 6, 1822)

In 1803 he served as the President of the Board of Agriculture and, as a farmer himself, was considered as an authority in matters of land cultivation.

He also showed interest in maintaining the wool export. He published a volume on the topic of wool and woolen trading. First, he opposed restraining the exportation of the raw material in his Observations on the Objections made to the Exportation of Wool from Great Britain to Ireland in 1800. And in the next decade, he released a series of pamphlet from 1809 to 1812 On the Trade in Wool and Woollens where he noticed the weakening export to the American states. He then advocated for the importation of sheep from Spain to be bred. The same sentiments re-appeared after a decade in his Report at the Meeting at Lewes Wool Fair between 1818 and 1820.

His passion for local economy is also present in maritime industry. In his Strictures on the necessity of inviolably maintaining the Navigation and Colonial System of Great Britain (London, 1804), he pointed out that the suspension of Navigation Laws that rendered England as a free port injures every branch of the British marine. Opening up the port is deemed disadvantageous and discouraging to the seamen, shipbuilders and shipbuilding trade, and in contrary to the interest of their naval force.

Despite his opinions being heralded as abreast with time, his views sometimes were considered as short-sighted and insular (Dictionary of Political Economy Volume 3, Palgrave, p. 390). An example is his conservative stance on the abolition of slavery, where he commented on slave trade reformers that "not one of them had the candour to come forward and say, that those whose property was to be sacrificed in this pursuit should have any compensation whatever for their losses."

Notes

References 
 Kidd, Charles, Williamson, David (editors). Debrett's Peerage and Baronetage (1990 edition). New York: St Martin's Press, 1990, 
 Jacques-Alphonse Mahul, Annuaire nécrologique, ou Supplément annuel et continuation de toutes les biographies ou dictionnaires historiques, 3e année, 1822, Paris : Ponthieu, 1823, p. 324–331 
The Annual Biography and Obituary, Volume 6, London : A. & R. Spottiswoode, New-Street-Square,1822, page 308-330
Palgrave, Robert Harry Inglis, Sir, Dictionary of Political Economy Volume 3, London : Macmillan 1915–1917, page 390-392

Attribution

External links

 

|-

|-

Sheffield
Sheffield
Sheffield, John Baker-Holroyd, 1st Earl of
Sheffield
Sheffield
Members of the Parliament of Great Britain for English constituencies
British MPs 1780–1784
British MPs 1790–1796
British MPs 1796–1800
Members of the Parliament of the United Kingdom for English constituencies
UK MPs 1801–1802
UK MPs who were granted peerages
Fellows of the Royal Society
Members of Parliament for Coventry
Barons Sheffield